Francis Constant Florini  (September 7, 1919 – October 17, 2008) was an American politician who served as the twenty-sixth Mayor   of North Adams, Massachusetts.

Florini died at the age of 89 on October 17, 2008.

See also
 List of mayors of North Adams, Massachusetts

External links
http://www.iberkshires.com/story/28732/Florini-Former-North-Adams-Mayor-Dies-at-89.html

External links
Online Obituary

Mayors of North Adams, Massachusetts
Massachusetts city council members
United States Army personnel of World War II
American people of Italian descent
1919 births
2008 deaths
University of Massachusetts Amherst alumni
People from Boothbay, Maine
Maine local politicians
20th-century American politicians
United States Army soldiers